Sebastian Papaiani (25 August 1936 – 27 September 2016) was a Romanian film and television actor. 

He was born in Pitești; his father was of Greek origin. He graduated from the Theatrical Arts and Cinematography Institute in 1960, debuting in the Geo Saizescu comedy Un surâs în plină vară (1963). He has a star on the Walk of Fame Bucharest.

In December 2002 he was awarded by then-President Ion Iliescu the National Order of Faithful Service, Knight rank. In 2014, Poșta Română issued a 1.60 lei stamp in his honor, part of the "Golden Stars of the Stage and Screen" series.

His first wife was actress Eugenia Giurgiu; the two had a son, Sebastian Jr.

Papaiani died at his home in Bucharest at age 80, after suffering a stroke, and was buried in the city's Bellu Cemetery.

Selected filmography

References

External links

1936 births
2016 deaths
People from Pitești
Romanian people of Greek descent
Caragiale National University of Theatre and Film alumni
Romanian male film actors
Romanian male television actors
20th-century Romanian male actors
21st-century Romanian male actors
Recipients of the National Order of Faithful Service
Burials at Bellu Cemetery